Guangji Temple may refer to:

 Guangji Temple (Beijing), in Beijing, China
 Guangji Temple (Hunan), in Hengyang, Hunan, China
 Guangji Temple (Jinzhou), in Jinzhou, Liaoning, China, a national historical and cultural site in Liaoning
 Guangji Temple (Tianjin), in Tianjin, China
 Guangji Temple (Xinzhou), in Wutai County, Xinzhou, Shanxi, China
 A temple on Mount Wutai, Shanxi, China
 Guangji Temple (Wuhu), in Wuhu, Anhui, China
 Guangji Temple Hua'an Shrine, in Baihe District, Tainan, Taiwan
 Guangji Temple Main Hall, a national historical and cultural site in Shanxi

Buddhist temple disambiguation pages